Oleg Lyashko may refer to:
Oleg Lyashko (swimmer) (born 1982), a swimmer from Uzbekistan
Oleh Lyashko, the leader of the Radical Party (Ukraine)